Nanomedicine is a biweekly peer-reviewed medical journal covering research on medical nanoscale-structured material and devices, biotechnology devices and molecular machine systems, and nanorobotics applications in medicine. It was established in 2006 and is published by Future Medicine. The editors-in-chief are Kostas Kostarelos (University of Manchester) and Charles R. Martin (University of Florida).

Abstracting and indexing 
The journal is abstracted and indexed in the Biotechnology Citation Index, Chemical Abstracts, Current Contents/Life Sciences, Embase/Excerpta Medica, Inspec, Index Medicus/MEDLINE/PubMed, Science Citation Index Expanded, and Scopus. According to the Journal Citation Reports, the journal has a 2016 impact factor of 4.727, ranking it 20th out of 158 journals in the category "Biotechnology & Applied Microbiology" and 24th out of 86 journals in the category "Nanoscience & Nanotechnology".

References

External links
 

English-language journals
Nanomedicine journals
Publications established in 2006
Biweekly journals
Future Science Group academic journals